Growing Over Life is the third studio album by British hip hop recording artist Wretch 32. It was released on 2 September 2016 through Polydor Records. The album peaked at number 5 on the UK Albums Chart. The album includes the singles "6 Words", "Antwi", "Liberation", "All a Dream", "I.O.U" and "Open Conversation & Mark Duggan".

Singles
"6 Words" was released as the lead single from the album on 16 November 2014. The song peaked at number 8 on the UK Singles Chart. The song also peaked at number 25 on the Australian Singles Chart. "Antwi" was released as the second single from the album on 19 May 2016. "Liberation" was released as the third single from the album on 5 July 2016. "All a Dream" was released as the fourth single from the album. "I.O.U" was released as the fifth single from the album. "Open Conversation & Mark Duggan" was released as the sixth single from the album on 18 November 2016.

Track listing

Charts

Release history

References

2016 albums
Wretch 32 albums